The Koon shot of Operation Castle was a test of a thermonuclear device designed at the University of California Radiation Laboratory (UCRL), now Lawrence Livermore National Laboratory (LLNL).

The "dry" two-stage device was known as "Morgenstern", and had a highly innovative secondary stage.  It was tested on April 7, 1954. The predicted yield was between 0.33 and 3.5 megatons, with an expected yield of 1 megaton. The actual yield was 110 kilotons. Morgenstern was thus a fizzle.

Post-shot analysis showed that the failure was due to the premature heating of the secondary by the neutron flux of the primary. This was a simple design defect, and not related to the unique geometry of the secondary. The UCRL's other shot, the "wet", i.e., cryogenic, Ramrod device, originally scheduled for the Echo shot, was cancelled because it shared the same design defect.

The name "Morgenstern" (German for Morning Star) was chosen because of the shape of the secondary. The secondary consisted of a central sphere from which spikes were radiating, resembling a morning star / mace. The spikes may have been an idea from Teller and colleagues to use implosive jets to compress the thermonuclear core. It was more than two decades before weapons were designed that utilized a secondary concept similar to that first tested in the Koon shot.

References
Hansen, Chuck, "The Swords of Armageddon: U.S. Nuclear Weapons Development since 1945" (CD-ROM). PDF, 2,600 pages, Sunnyvale, CA, Chukelea Publications, 1995, 2007.  (2nd Ed.)

Explosions in 1954
Nuclear testing at Bikini Atoll
1954 in military history
1954 in the environment
1950s in the Marshall Islands
1954 in the Trust Territory of the Pacific Islands
April 1954 events in Oceania